The Corn Popper is a toy manufactured by Fisher-Price since 1957. Aimed at pre-schoolers, when the Corn Popper is pushed or pulled, colored balls inside a plastic dome bounce and create a popping, bouncing noise.

History
The Corn Popper was invented in 1957 by Arthur Holt, and sold to Fisher-Price for $50. The Corn Popper is one of the most popular toys for young children in history, and was designed to help them learn to walk. It sends tiny, colorful, gumball size balls flying and hitting the plastic dome, to create its signature loud popping noise.

Accessories
Corn Popper keyrings are also on the market; they are miniature versions and can still "pop corn".

References

External links
Official website

Products introduced in 1957
Fisher-Price
Physical activity and dexterity toys